John Marlin may refer to:

 John Mahlon Marlin, New England armorer and gunsmith
 John Marlin (Texas settler), Texian patriot and namesake of Marlin, Texas